Wendy James (born 21 January 1966) is an English singer-songwriter most notable for her work with the pop band Transvision Vamp.

Transvision Vamp

Born in London to Norwegian parents, James was adopted soon after birth. She left home at the age of sixteen, moving to the East Sussex seaside resort town of Brighton. There she met Nick Christian Sayer, who became her boyfriend and musical collaborator. Sayer and James moved to London, where they teamed up with friends Dave Parsons, Tex Axile and Pol Burton, with whom they formed the pop-punk band Transvision Vamp. James was the lead singer and focal point of the group, and attracted media attention with her sexually charged and rebellious image.

The band was signed by MCA in December 1986 and released a cover version of the Holly and the Italians song "Tell That Girl to Shut Up" in late 1987. Months later the follow-up single "I Want Your Love", with its pop/punk crossover appeal, entered the Top 10 in the UK Singles Chart. The band went on to release the hit album Pop Art in October. 1989 was the band's most successful year, with the number 3 hit single "Baby I Don't Care" and hit album Velveteen which entered the UK Albums Chart at number 1 and was a hit worldwide.

Solo career, and Racine
When the decision had been made for Transvision Vamp to split, James wrote to Elvis Costello asking for his guidance. In response Costello, collaborating with his then wife Cait O'Riordan on five of the ten songs, wrote a full album's worth of material for James. These songs made up the tracks on her 1993 solo album Now Ain't the Time for Your Tears. Produced by Chris Kimsey, it reached No. 43 in the UK Albums Chart in March 1993. However the album failed to sell in significant numbers, and James "dropped from the music scene". She signed to One Little Indian and began work on an album entitled Lies in Chinatown, which was not completed.

James formed a band named Racine in 2004. The group released two albums, Number One and Racine 2.

Racine broke up in December 2008, prior to shutting down their official website. The members of the band went on to join other bands and none of them worked on James's next album.

James announced on her MySpace blog that she had been working on an album entitled I Came Here to Blow Minds, which was recorded in Paris in 2009 and mixed in Australia later that year. Finally, a release date of 19 October 2010 (for digital release) was posted on James's official Facebook page in August 2010. One track from the album had already been made available for download on RCRD LBL. since May 2009.

James released an album, The Price of the Ticket on 19 February 2016.

In October 2019, James was touring as "The Wendy James Band" in support of the Psychedelic Furs, promoting a new album, Queen High Straight.

Discography

Transvision Vamp albums
Pop Art (1988)
Velveteen (1989)
Little Magnets Versus the Bubble of Babble (1991)

Solo albums
Now Ain't the Time for Your Tears (1993) – UK No. 43, AUS No. 132
I Came Here to Blow Minds (2011)
The Price of the Ticket (2016)
Queen High Straight (2020)

Racine albums
Number One (2004)
Racine 2 (2007)

Singles
"The Nameless One" (1993) – UK No. 34, AUS No. 106
"London's Brilliant" (1993) – UK No. 62
"Do You Know What I'm Saying?" (1993) – UK No. 78, AUS No. 230

References

External links
 Official website

1966 births
Living people
English adoptees
English people of Norwegian descent
English songwriters
Women rock singers
People from Brighton
21st-century English women singers
21st-century English singers